The 1995 24 Hours of Le Mans was the 63rd Grand Prix of Endurance, and took place on 17 and 18 June 1995 in one of the wettest races in the event's history with about 17 hours of steady rain.
The race was won by the #59 McLaren F1 GTR driven by JJ Lehto, Yannick Dalmas and Masanori Sekiya entered in the GT1 category. This was the first Le Mans win for a driver from Finland and for a driver from Japan. It was also McLaren's first win, at its first attempt. Such was the marque's dominance that its cars filled four of the first five places - Ferrari did it with its two cars in 1949, but other manufacturers like Jaguar, Porsche, Ford or Audi achieved their Le Mans fame only after 2, 3 or more years attempting their first win.

The car was already well known for dominating the BPR Global GT Series with customer teams, but the car that won was actually the initial GTR prototype. This was on loan to Lanzante Motorsport, and prepared by McLaren's Unit 12 and overseen by McLaren's Chief Engineer James Robinson to run it on behalf of Kokusai Kaihatsu Racing. Mario Andretti's Courage finished second, having been the sentimental favourite of many in the run-up to the race. However the reliability of the production-based McLaren helped it defeat the much faster Le Mans prototypes, although in an interview 20 years  later Graham Humphrys (former Spice technical director), who engineered the race winning car, attributed the win to the rain which fell on the circuit overnight, which eased the stress on the car's relatively fragile transmission, and which also saw a remarkable performance by Lehto, who was as much as 30 seconds a lap faster than his rivals at times. Humphrys also managed to identify the source of the gear selection problems which the Kokusai car and the other McLarens in the race suffered from, working out that the exposed gear linkage mechanism was filling with water and dirt from the wet conditions, and solved the problem by filling the affected area with WD-40 at every pit stop.

The top three spots in GT2 were taken by Honda NSX and two Callaway Corvettes.  The class was now showing manufacturer diversity unlike previous year dominated by the Porsche 911 derivatives since the mid-1970s.

Regulations and Entries
With the ongoing good working relationship with IMSA, the Automobile Club de l'Ouest (ACO) phased out its LM P1 category, instead drawing up regulations based closely on IMSA's World Sportscar (WSC) class. In return, IMSA agreed to allow turbo-engined cars into WSC, given the number of Group C chassis still in circulation. The LM P2 class was left as is; however, the other classes had the following restrictions, some revised from the previous year:
 WSC       max 4.0L or 3.0L (turbo), with rev limit of 8500 rpm (2-valve V8) or 10500 rpm (4-valve V12), fuel tank 80L,  min weight according to engine size and type, max tyre width 18" 
 LM P2:       fuel tank 80L,  min weight 620 kg, with production engines, max tyre width 12" 
 LM GT1:      fuel tank 100L,  min weight 900 kg,  max tyre width 14"
 LM GT2:      fuel tank 100L,  min weight 900 kg,  max tyre width 12"

The previous year's "one-off model" rule, controversially exploited by Porsche in the 1994 race, stayed in place for GT1. However, GT2 cars had to be based on cars in series production since February 1995.

As before, these regulations generated a huge amount of interest, and the ACO received 99 entries. In response, the ACO built 2 further pit bays to increase capacity to 50 cars. They granted 20 well-performing teams an automatic entry, then chose a further 50 to go through qualification for the remaining 30 spots on the grid. It aimed to keep a balance between the WSC and over-represented GT classes, although the lines were now blurring a bit in GT1.

Sportscar specialists Courage, Kremer, WR and Debora returned in WSC/P2, along with the first Ferrari prototype (the 333SP) seen at Le Mans for 23 years, which had been running in the American IMSA championship. Commissioned off Ferrari for the WSC by Giampiero Moretti of Momo Racing

The Japanese returned in force in the GT1 class with Toyota, Nissan, Mazda and Honda all sending works, or works-supported, teams. But the biggest splash came from McLaren: its new F1 GTR supercar had won 6 of the 7 races in the 1995 BPR Global GT series to date. Six of the McLarens from that series arrived, and even the original T-car was hastily prepared for a new Japanese team desperate to be involved. The McLaren was the fastest road car in the world and a natural choice for Le Mans; Gordon Murray's carbon-fibre design conforming to the minimum weight (1000 kg), minimum size and maximum power-to-weight ratio (with the 6.1L BMW V12 engine) that a good race-car always has. The ACO's air restrictors limited its engine to 636 bhp, just 9 more than the road-going version.

Other returning marques in GT1 included Jaguar, Ferrari and Porsche, with single works entries also from Venturi and Lister. In GT2, the ubiquitous Porsche 911s were up against Callaway, Honda and newcomers Marcos.

Qualification
Qualifying proved to be one of the greatest days for the small French Welter Racing team, rivaling its 400 km/h speed record on the Mulsanne straight in 1988. Ever the builder of small, nimble and very fast prototypes, Gérard Welter's latest version, the WR LM95, was no exception: both cars, driven by William David and Patrick Gonin locked out the front row of the grid for the great race. David was the first driver to take pole on debut. Curiously, it was also the first time that two single-seaters had been on the front row at Le Mans since the 1967 French F1 GP that was run there.

Behind them were the three Courages of van der Poele, Wollek and Lagorce, although the van der Poele car was then disqualified from starting for being found 17 kg underweight after an engine change. The Wollek/Andretti/Hélary Courage was the only car in the field where all three drivers lapped in under 4 minutes in practice.

Fifth on the grid was the Stuck/Boutsen/Bouchut Kremer K8, then came the first of the GT1 cars: three Ferrari F40s, headed by the Ennea Ferrari Club #41 of Ayles/Monti/Mancini, shocking the McLaren teams by beating out the Kokusai McLaren and the works Venturi. The EuroMotorsport Ferrari prototype was kept out of most of the qualifying while the ACO argued with the team about checking the maximum engine revs - in the end it was 17th on the grid.

Fastest in the GT2 class was the best of the Agusta Callaways, in 23rd, well up the grid from the Swiss Porsche of Enzo Calderari in 32nd, and the private Japanese Honda NSX. Back of the grid was the private American team in their overweight Corvette ZR1 in GT1, nearly 20 seconds slower than the Callaway Corvette pole in GT2.

Race

Start
This was one of the wettest Le Mans on record, but at the start of the race the weather was clear. Five cars, including Boutsen's Kremer, the Giroix Jacadi McLaren (running on a synthetic-alcohol fuel distilled from beets) and Kunimitsu Honda in GT2, had to start from the pit-lane because of last minute issues. At flag-fall the two WR's, and Wollek's Courage, took off and quickly put distance to the rest of the field - nearly half a lap at the end of the first hour. Because of the ACO equivalency regulations, their laps were nearly 30 seconds off Eddie Irvine's quickest laps in his Toyota in 1993. John Nielsen in the #49 Dave Price McLaren, and Henri Pescarolo in the #11 Courage led that pursuit battling for fourth. Massimo Sigala in the Ferrari prototype had made rapid progress from its lowly starting position, even passing Nielsen into 4th until stone damage stopped the engine at Arnage on only lap 7.

The rain arrived at the end of the first hour. It stayed all night and well into Sunday morning, with scattered showers right to the finish. Many cars spun or skated off, caught out on their slick tyres. Both the WRs pitted losing time with faulty windscreens, proving again to be fast but fragile. Worse was to follow in the 5th hour when Gonin aquaplaned off at speed and somersaulted at the Mulsanne kink into a big accident. He was taken to hospital with 4 broken ribs and a broken shoulder-blade and bringing out the safety cars for 37 minutes.

In the heavy rain, the WSC cars lost their power advantage and upon the restart four of the McLarens were dueling with Wollek's Courage. But when Mario Andretti tangled lapping a Kremer in the Porsche curves and crashed (taking 30 minutes and losing 6 laps to get repaired) it appeared to be a GT1 benefit with a McLaren 1-2-3. The Ferrari was out, Pescarolo's Courage had stopped at Arnage with a flat battery, and the Kremer was proving diabolical to drive in the wet (even regenmeister Hans-Joachim Stuck put it in the wall at the first chicane). The Larbre team's Porsche 911 Evos were both running well, keeping up with the McLarens and getting up to fourth. Terrific driving from Toshio Suzuki had got his Nissan Skyline up to an excellent 7th overall until the car's gearbox broke at 11pm. Both Honda GT1s were out: one with a broken clutch and the other crashed heavily in the rain, needing extensive repairs. In GT2, the Kremer and Stadler Porsches had pulled out a 3-lap lead over the Callaways and the Lister.

Night
Going into the night, the leading WSC car - the other Kremer, driven by Lässig/Konrad/de Azevedo - was running down in 11th. The Dave Price McLarens alternated the lead according to pit-stops. The rival Gulf Racing McLarens, dominant in the BPR series had been having many problems: series-leader and team-owner Ray Bellm had had an earlier off, losing 7 laps. Worse luck was his teammate Philippe Alliot, who was leading when he got punted off into the barriers by a GT2 Porsche he had just overtaken.

Bad luck also dogged the Larbre Compétition GT1 Porsches: In the early evening the car, of the team-owner Jack Leconte, had gone off into the Arnage gravel trap. Both Jesús Pareja and Emmanuel Collard had successively got their cars up into 4th overall, but both crashed out into retirement before midnight. The latter crash also took out the GT2-leading Stadler Porsche when Andreas Fuchs misjudged his braking at Mulsanne corner, hitting Collard. Meanwhile, the PC Automotive Jaguar was shadowing the McLarens; from starting 22nd on the grid it had moved up to 4th, chased by the Downing Kudzu-Mazda, Stuck's Kremer and Wollek's Courage making a spirited recovery. With the demise of the Porsches, the GT2 race was now between the three Callaways (that became two when Thyrring crashed the 'works' car at the first Mulsanne chicane at 1am) and the private Porsche of Jean-François Veroux that started second to last, but now only a lap behind.

At 3am, after 9 hours contesting the lead (with a broken window-wiper), the Nielsen/Mass McLaren pitted with a slipping clutch that ultimately proved terminal. The sister car of Andy Wallace and the Bells (father & son) inherited the lead. Wallace did some incredible stints in the rain - some of it on slick tyres. Meanwhile, the dark horse Kokusai team had been inexorably moving up the board. While others spun or pitted, it never missed a beat, and through the night JJ Lehto and Dalmas put in a hard chase getting up to 2nd.
The Jaguar gave up with a broken crankshaft at 5am by which time the Courage was back up to third (but 4 laps down), the Jacardi McLaren 4th and Bellm's remaining Gulf McLaren in 5th.

Morning
As dawn broke the rain finally eased off and the Courage started to get very fast, gradually pulling back laps on the McLarens. When Wallace had to pit for fresh brakepads, the lead dropped to less than a minute to the Kokusai McLaren. But then the 53-year-old, 5-time winner, Derek Bell showed why he is considered one of the world's best sports-car racers - with the pressure on, he matched and then beat Lehto's very rapid lap times. The three surviving WSC cars - the Courage, Kremer and Kudzu were chasing.

Overshadowed by the McLarens, all the Ferrari F40s had had troubled races after promising so much. However Stéphane Ratel's Pilot Racing Ferrari had been holding 8th position overall for six hours when, just before midday, Michel Ferté connected with Blundell's Gulf McLaren and skidded on debris at the Dunlop chicane, beaching it in the gravel trap. Extracting it took 5 minutes and lost it three places. In GT2, after losing 6 laps at the start, the Kunimitsu Honda had run like clockwork and now its better fuel economy was paying dividends as it overtook the Callaways and settled into the top 10 overall.

Finish and post-race
With just 2 hours to go, the McLaren's feared delicate transmission struck the leading DPR McLaren which pitted with gear-selection problems. After a 5-minute delay in the pits, Bell Snr slammed it into 6th and rejoined the race. That was all Dalmas needed to take the lead and from there they were never headed. With less than an hour to go, Andretti passed the ailing Harrods McLaren for second place, and soon after overtook Lehto to get onto the lead lap. Handing over to Bob Wollek, they chased hard but in the end just came up short, barely 3 minutes behind. Wallace nursed the DPR McLaren home a lap further behind, five laps ahead of the Gulf and Giroix Jacadi McLarens, and the remaining two WSC cars: the Kremer and Kudzu-Mazda.

In GT2, despite starting from the pitlane, the Kunimitsu Honda came home in front, in 8th overall, comfortably two laps ahead of the Jelinski Agusta Callaway, itself two laps ahead of its sister car. The new Porsche 993 GT2 customer car, despite winning 10 of the 12 BPR races this year, came away empty-handed from Le Mans.

Official results

Statistics
 Pole Position - William David, #9 Welter Racing - 3:46.05
 Fastest Lap - Patrick Gonin, #8 Welter Racing - 3:51.41
 Winner's Distance - 4055.8 km
 Average Speed - 168.992 km/h, which was the lowest average winning speed since the Flockhart/Sanderson Jaguar in 1956
 Highest Trap Speed — Courage C34 - 311 km/h (race), McLaren F1 GTR - 281 km/h  (qualifying)
 Attendance - 168000

Notes

References
 Spurring, Quentin (2014)    Le Mans 1990-99    Sherborne, Dorset: Evro Publishing  
 Moity, Christian & Teissedre, Jean-Marc (1995)    1995 Le Mans 24 Hours    Brussels: IHM Publishing  
 Laban, Brian (2001)    Le Mans 24 Hours    London: Virgin Books

External links
 Racing Sports Cars – Le Mans 24 Hours 1995 entries, results, technical detail. Retrieved 5 July 2016.
 Racing Sports Cars – Le Mans 24 Hours 1995 (Photo Archive). Retrieved 5 July 2016.
 Le Mans History – Race history, hour-by-hour (incl. pictures, YouTube links). Retrieved 5 July 2016.
 Formula 2 – Le Mans 1995 results & reserve entries. Retrieved 5 July 2016.
 Motorsport Magazine – Motorsport Magazine archive. Retrieved 5 July 2016.
 You-Tube – 1-hour review of the 1995 race. Retrieved 5 July 2016.
 You-Tube: Le Mans Memories – 7x 10min videos with footage & interviews by McLaren for the 20th anniversary. Retrieved 5 July 2016.

Le Mans
24 Hours of Le Mans
24 Hours of Le Mans races